The 2019–20 Bethune–Cookman Wildcats men's basketball team represent Bethune–Cookman University in the 2019–20 NCAA Division I men's basketball season. The Wildcats, led by 3rd-year head coach Ryan Ridder, play their home games at Moore Gymnasium in Daytona Beach, Florida as members of the Mid-Eastern Athletic Conference.

Previous season
The Wildcats finished the 2018–19 season 14–17 overall, 9–7 in MEAC play, finishing in a tie for fifth place. The team received a No. 5 seed in the MEAC tournament, where they were defeated 71–80 in the quarterfinals by No. 5 seed Howard.

Roster

Schedule and results

|-
!colspan=12 style=| Non-conference regular season

|-
!colspan=9 style=| MEAC regular season

|-
!colspan=12 style=| MEAC tournament
|-

|-

Source

References

Bethune–Cookman Wildcats men's basketball seasons
Bethune-Cookman Wildcats
Bethune-Cookman Wildcats men's basketball
Bethune-Cookman Wildcats men's basketball